Cynthia Carter (born 30 January 1959) is a Reader in the School of Journalism, Media and Culture, Cardiff University, and co-founding editor of the journal Feminist Media Studies.

She has been the guest editor of a special "Gendered News" issue of Journalism: Theory, Practice and Criticism, and, along with Stephanie Hemelryk Donald, she was co-guest editor of a special "Children, Media and Conflict" issue of the Journal of Children and Media.

Carter was the chair of the Feminist Scholarship Division of the International Communication Association between 2003 and 2005.

Publications

Books

Book chapters 
  Pdf.
 
  Pdf.
 
 
 
  Pdf.

Journal articles 
 
 
 
 
 
 
 
 
 
 
 
 
 
 
 url = https://doi.org/10.1371/journal.pone.0148434

See also 
 Linda Steiner

References

External links 
 Profile page: Cynthia Carter Cardiff School of Journalism, Media and Cultural Studies, Cardiff University.

1959 births
Living people
Academics of Cardiff University
Alumni of the University of Strathclyde
Alumni of the University of Wales
British feminist writers
British mass media scholars
Gender studies academics